Order of Mehr is one of the badges of honor in Iran, established by "Council of Iran Ministers" on September 13, 1994. According to "Article 18" of the "Regulations on the Awarding of Government Orders" of Iran, in addition to the women can having other badges, the "Order of Mehr" due to honor the status and the position of women in the Islamic Republic of Iran, is awarded to women who are source of valuable works in one of the following ways:

 Constructive and active participation in social, economic and political affairs
 Introducing the exemplary of Muslim woman in society and trying to explain and promote its ideological and social foundations
 Practical presentation of the exemplary of excellent mother or spouse, especially among mothers and wives of martyrs, veterans and freedmans who with dedication in maintaining and strengthening the family, have provided outstanding service in cultural, educational, or research areas
 Expressing competence in the international arena in a way that honors the country and represents the woman personality in the Islamic Republic of Iran

Recipients

Types
The "Order of Mehr" has three types of medal:

See also
 Order of Freedom (Iran)
 Order of Altruism
 Order of Research
 Order of Work and Production
 Order of Justice (Iran)
 Order of Construction
 Order of Knowledge
 Order of Education and Pedagogy
 Order of Persian Politeness
 Order of Independence (Iran)
 Order of Service
 Order of Courage (Iran)
 Order of Culture and Art
 Order of Merit and Management
 Order of Fath
 Order of Islamic Republic
 Order of Nasr

References

External links
 Orders of Iran Regulations in diagrams
 Orders of Iran in diagrams
 Types of Iran's badges and their material benefits

CS1 uses Persian-language script (fa)
Awards established in 1994
Civil awards and decorations of Iran
1994 establishments in Iran